Oliveira do Bairro is a town and a municipality in the district of Aveiro in Portugal. The population in 2011 was 47,729, in an area of 335.27 km2. It had 16,994 eligible voters in 2006. The town itself had a population of 3,077 in 2001.

The municipality is in the Bairrada area. The present Mayor is Duarte Novo. The municipal holiday is Ascension Day.

Demographics

Parishes
Administratively, the municipality is divided into 4 civil parishes (freguesias):
 Bustos, Troviscal e Mamarrosa
 Oiã
 Oliveira do Bairro
 Palhaça

Cultural institutions
 União Filarmónica do Troviscal, Troviscal - Aveiro, conducted by André Granjo

Twinning cities
Oliveira do Bairro is twinned with two cities:

 Benguela, Angola and 
 Lamballe, France

Notable people 
 Ilda Figueiredo (born 1948 in Troviscal, Oliveira do Bairro) a Portuguese politician and Member of the European Parliament for the Portuguese Communist Party
 João Tomás (born 1975) a Portuguese retired footballer with 378 club caps and 4 for Portugal

References

External links

Town Hall official website

 
Municipalities of Aveiro District